Thidarat Pengwichai (born 28 November 1992) is a Thai indoor volleyball player. With her club Bangkok Glass she competed at the 2016 World Club Championship.

Awards

Clubs
 2013 Thai-Denmark Super League -  Bronze medal, with Ayutthaya A.T.C.C
 2013–14 Thailand League -  Bronze medal, with Krungkao Mektec
 2014 Thai-Denmark Super League -  Champion, with Ayutthaya A.T.C.C
 2014–15 Thailand League -  Runner-Up, with Ayutthaya A.T.C.C
 2015 Thai-Denmark Super League -  Bronze medal, with Ayutthaya A.T.C.C
 2016 Asian Club Championship -  Bronze medal, with Bangkok Glass
 2016–17 Thailand League -  Runner-up, with Bangkok Glass
 2017 Thai-Denmark Super League -  Runner-up, with Bangkok Glass
 2017–18 Thailand League -  Third, with Bangkok Glass
 2018 Thai-Denmark Super League -  Runner-up, with Bangkok Glass

References

External links
 FIVB Biography

1992 births
Living people
Thidarat Pengwichai
Thidarat Pengwichai